Kincade may refer to:

People
 John Kincade, American sports talk show host 
 Keylon Kincade (born 1982), American football player

Other
 Kincade (band)
 United States v. Kincade, lawsuit
 Kincade Fire

See also
 Kincaid (disambiguation)
 Kinkade